Before the Robots is the studio follow-up album to Better Than Ezra's 2001 studio release Closer and debut album on Artemis Records. It was released on April 4, 2005, internationally and a day later in North America.

The band enjoyed their biggest success since 1996's Friction, Baby on the reworked single "A Lifetime", which first appeared on 2001's Closer. The tracks "A Southern Thing" and "Our Last Night" also gained some radio airplay. Additionally, the album track "Juicy" was the featured music in promotions for the second season of the ABC series Desperate Housewives.

Prior to the album's release, the band offered to autograph all copies of the album pre-ordered through their website.

The album title reportedly came to the band's drummer Travis McNabb in a dream.  He dreamt of seeing a UK buzz band called Before the Robots.  The next day, he asked fellow band members if there was such a band.  Upon finding out there was not, they decided to adopt the phrase for this album's title.

On January 22, 2010, American country-pop singer Taylor Swift covered "Breathless" at a performance at the Hope for Haiti Now: A Global Benefit for Earthquake Relief event, a charity telethon to benefit the victims of the 2010 Haiti earthquake. Swift has also been known to cover "Our Last Night" at many of her concerts.

Track listing
All tracks written by Kevin Griffin.

Personnel
Better Than Ezra
 Tom Drummond – bass guitar
 Kevin Griffin – vocals, guitar, piano
 Travis Aaron McNabb – drums

Additional personnel
 Tim Palmer - Mixing
 Greg Collins – engineering
 Jon Gros – B3 organ, Whirly, Rhodes
 Jason Hill – background vocals
 Brian Karzcig – background vocals
 Eric Lucero – trumpet
 Mark Mullins – trombone

2005 albums
Better Than Ezra albums
Artemis Records albums